This is a list of National Basketball Association players who have had 38 or more rebounds in a single game.

Multiple occurrences: Wilt Chamberlain 29 times (four times in the playoffs) and Bill Russell 23 times (seven times in the playoffs).

The NBA did not record rebounds until the 1950–51 season.

Pre-1973

Since 1973
This is a complete listing for total rebounds since the  season, but it is not a complete listing for offensive or defensive rebounds.

See also
NBA regular season records
List of NCAA Division I men's basketball players with 30 or more rebounds in a game

Notes

External links
Top single-game rebounders (35-plus) from nbahoopsonline.com

Reb